Caffeic acid phenethyl ester (CAPE) is a natural phenolic chemical compound. It is the ester of caffeic acid and phenethyl alcohol.

Natural occurrences 
CAPE is found in a variety of plants. It is also a component of propolis from honeybee hives.

Potential pharmacology 
A variety of in vitro pharmacology and effects in animal models have been reported for CAPE, but their clinical significance is unknown.  It has antimitogenic, anticarcinogenic, anti-inflammatory, and immunomodulatory properties in vitro.  Another study also showed that CAPE suppresses acute immune and inflammatory responses in vitro.
This anti-cancer effect was also seen when mice skin was treated with bee propolis and exposed to TPA, a chemical that induced skin papillomas. CAPE significantly reduced the number of papillomas.

References 

Hydroxycinnamic acid esters
Vinylogous carboxylic acids